This list of castles in Croatia includes castles, remains (ruins) of castles and other fortifications like fortresses which used to be a castles at some point in history. A castle (from Latin castellum) is a type of fortified structure built in Europe (thus also in Croatia) and the Middle East during the Middle Ages. In its simplest terms, the definition of a castle accepted amongst academics is "a private fortified residence". 

Construction and development of manors and castles on the territory of Croatia can be followed with certainty in the last two millennium – from Roman villa rusticas and palaces (like Diocletian's Palace), to medieval castles (burgs), Renaissance villas-summer houses in Dubrovnik and Dalmatia, to Baroque and historicist manors of Northern Croatia, and town villas and palaces in most bigger Croatian towns.
The biggest fortress in Croatia is located in Knin.

See also 
List of castles
Military history of Croatia
Walls of Dubrovnik
Walls of Ston

References
Notes

Bibliography

Further reading

External links 

 Map of Castles and Fortifications of Croatia
 Croatian castles
 Dvorci, kurije i ljetnikovci u Hrvatskoj  
 Croatia – Castles and Manors
 Castle and Fortress Ruins in Zagreb County

Croatia
Castles
Croatia
Castles